Richard William Van Raaphorst (December 10, 1942 – October 3, 2020) was an American football placekicker in the American Football League for the San Diego Chargers. He also was a member of the Dallas Cowboys in the National Football League. He played college football at Ohio State University.

Early years
Van Raaphorst attended Charlevoix High School, before moving on to Ohio State University.

He was named the starter of the 1961 team coached by Woody Hayes that won the Big Ten Conference, but the Ohio State faculty council wanting to show that football was not overemphasized, voted against sending the Buckeyes to the Rose Bowl. The University of Minnesota was the replacement team that beat UCLA 21-3. He was injured as a junior.

As a senior, he broke the school and conference distance record with a 48-yard field goal. The next game he broke it again with a 49-yard field goal. He also set a record with 6 field goals in Big Ten Conference games and 8 in the season. The next game he broke it again with a 49-yard field goal.

Professional career

Cleveland Browns
Van Raaphorst was selected by the Cleveland Browns in the tenth round (138th overall) of the 1964 NFL Draft. On August 24, he was traded to the Dallas Cowboys in exchange for a draft choice, after the team decided to keep 40-year-old Lou Groza as the starter.

Dallas Cowboys
In 1964, the Dallas Cowboys were looking for a replacement for Sam Baker, and when rookie Billy Lothridge couldn't fill the kicker role, the team acquired Van Raaphorst and named him the starter. He struggled throughout the year and was replaced the next season with Danny Villanueva.

Chicago Bears
On January 13, 1965, he was claimed off waivers by the Chicago Bears, but was waived before the start of the season.

San Diego Chargers
In 1965, he was signed by the San Diego Chargers of the American Football League to their taxi squad. The next year, he was named the starter and kicked 16 field goals, while also setting a franchise record with 7 field goals attempts against the New York Jets on October 8. At the time, he had the second most field goals (31) made in franchise history.

Cincinnati Bengals
Van Raaphorst was selected by the Cincinnati Bengals in the 1968 AFL expansion draft from the San Diego Chargers roster, but he opted to retire instead of reporting to the team.

Personal life
After football, he worked as a real estate developer. He served as a color analyst on the San Diego Chargers radio broadcasts in the 1970s. He won the 1968 Professional Football Players Golf Tournament.

His son Jeff Van Raaphorst played quarterback in the NFL for the Atlanta Falcons and received the 1987 Rose Bowl MVP award.

Van Raaphorst died on October 3, 2020, in San Diego, California at the age of 77.

References

1942 births
2020 deaths
American Football League All-Star players
American Football League players
American football placekickers
Dallas Cowboys players
National Football League announcers
Ohio State Buckeyes football players
People from Charlevoix, Michigan
Players of American football from Michigan
San Diego Chargers players
San Diego Chargers announcers